Environmental epigenetics is a branch of epigenetics that studies the influence of external environmental factors on the gene expression of a developing embryo. The way that genes are expressed may be passed down from parent to offspring through epigenetic modifications, although environmental influences do not alter the genome itself.

During embryonic development, epigenetic modifications determine which genes are expressed, which in turn determines the embryo's phenotype. When the offspring is still developing, genes can be turned on and off depending on exposure to certain environmental factors. Certain genes being turned on or off can increase the risk of developmental diseases or abnormal phenotypes. Environmental influence on epigenetics is highly variable, but certain environmental factors can greatly increase the risk of detrimental diseases being expressed at both early and adult life stages.

Environmental triggers for epigenetic change

Mechanisms influencing epigenetics

DNA methylation 

One mechanism of epigenetic modification is DNA methylation. DNA methylation is the process of adding a methyl group to a cytosine base in the DNA strand, via covalent bond. This process is carried out by specific enzymes. These methyl additions can be reversed in a process known as demethylation. The presence or absence of methyl groups can attract proteins involved in gene repression, or inhibit the binding of certain transcription factors, thus preventing methylated genes from being transcribed, ultimately affecting phenotypic expression.

Acetylation 

Acetylation is a reaction that introduces an acetyl group into an organic chemical compound, typically by substituting an acetyl group for a hydrogen atom. Deacetylation is the removal of an acetyl group from an organic chemical compound. Histone acetylation and deacetylation affect the three-dimensional structure of chromatin. A more relaxed chromatin structure leads to greater rates of genetic transcription, whereas a tighter structure inhibits transcription.

References 

Wikipedia Student Program

Biology